is a 2018 Japanese superhero film, serving as the film adaptation of the 2017-2018 television series Kamen Rider Build, taking place between Episodes 45 and 46 of the TV series and featuring the debut of Kamen Rider Zi-O'''s titular protagonist. 

Plot
Following the civil war's conclusion, Japan's new city-state governors promise a new age of prosperity on their inauguration day. But the new Touto governor Kengo Inō rallies anti-Kamen Rider sentiment with the populace hypnotized into seeing Sento Kiryū as an enemy of the state. The mob chase down Sento as Kamen Rider Build after he saved a boy and his older sister to a stadium, an unaffected Kazumi Sawatari and Gentoku Himuro covering his escape before their capture by the new Hokuto governor Ryōka Saiga as the Scissors Lost Smash. After subduing Misora and Sawa once reaching Nascita, Sento attempts to call Ryūga Banjō who was abducted by the new Seito governor Mitsuomi Gōbara, provoking him into a fight after transforming into the Zebra Lost Smash while revealing himself to be responsible for Kasumi Ogura's death. The fight ends when Inō arrives, with Gōbara infecting a distracted Ryūga.

Sento  hacks into a government facility's database to confirm the new governors as Soichi's Kiwami Project teammates before being confronted by Inō. Inō explains he and the other governors are actually members of the Blood Race like Evolt and served as his co-conspirators in manipulating various events as part of their goal of destroying Earth. But Evolt's deviation from their plan forced the governors' hand with their Build Annihilation Plan, a brainwashed Ryūga attacking Sento as Kamen Rider Cross-Z. As Build is defeated, Inō reveals the populace truly consider Kamen Riders as reminders of the civil war's horrors. Ryūga then gives Sento's Hazard Trigger to Inō, using it with his Cobra Lost Fullbottle and Ryūga's Great Cross-Z Dragon to become Kamen Rider Blood while absorbing his kin and Ryūga as Evolto carries the unconscious Sento away.

Once in a safe place, Sento wakes up from a dream of Takumi Katsuragi's memories of the Skywall Disaster where his father Shinobu told him that Ryūga is their ace against the aliens. Evolto belittles Sento while explaining that Inō only needs to Pandora Box to destroy the world, with a despondent Sento walking off before he receives a call from Inō offering to trade Ryūga for the Pandora Box. Sento engages Takumi in a metaphysical debate, his previous self lamenting over failing to honor his father's request as the aliens perverted his research for their schemes. But Sento counters that Project Build allowed them to protect their friends while adamant that Ryūga is essential to Evolto's defeat.

The next day, Sento brings the Pandora Box to the governors with Inō going back on his word while challenging Sento to take Ryūga back by force. Sento accepts as he turns into Build Genius, remaining determined in the losing battle before using the Gold Rabbit Fullbottle's power to extract Ryūga from Blood alongside Blood's kinsmen. Blood ignores the setback while combining the Hazard Trigger with the Pandora Box to destroy the planet at its core. With Kazumi and Gentoku battling Blood's kinsmen after Nariaki Utsumi eventually freed them, Sento notices a restored Ryūga's Silver Dragon Fullbottle and deduces their Fullbottles together can destroy Evolt and his kinsmen. Vernage intervenes to restore Misora and Sawa before merging the two Fullbottles with the Genius Fullbottle into the Cross-ZBuild Can, with Sento unintentionally merging himself and Ryuga into Kamen Rider Cross-ZBuild.

Cross-ZBuild forces Blood back to the surface while Kamen Riders Grease and Rouge destroy the Zebra and Scissors Lost Smash, explaining that Kamen Riders's drive fight for those who can build the future with the alien's death restoring the populace while Evolto gloats over his treacherous subordinates' deserved demise. After the Cross-ZBuild Can defused back into its components, the group are still dismayed at the continued anti-Kamen Rider sentiment though Sento is not bothered as long as those who can build the future after being thanked by the boy he saved earlier.

Sometime later, Sento is researching a means to reproduce a similar combination like Cross-ZBuild to defeat Evolto when he is teleported by the white Pandora panel to a battle between various Kamen Riders and their respective enemies. The monsters are then destroyed by a mysterious Kamen Rider equipping himself with the Build Armor, introducing himself to Sento as the apparent demon king Kamen Rider Zi-O.

Cast
: 
: 
: 
: 
: 
: 
: 
: 
: 
: 
: 
Citizen: 
Newscaster: 
Weather reporter: 
Reporter: 
: 
: 
: 
: 
, Evol Driver Voice: 
: 
: 
Build Driver Voice: 
Sclash Driver, Crocodile Crack Fullbottle, Cross-Z Magma Knuckle, and Great Cross-Z Dragon Voices: 
Ziku-Driver Equipment Voice: , 

Production
The film was initially planned to be a zombie film, but was changed after concerns it will be seen as a horror film, thus scaring away audiences.

It was initially planned for all 3 members of the "Blood Tribe" that appeared in the film to become Kamen Riders, but due to budget constraints, it was changed to just the leader.

Theme song
"Everlasting Sky"
Lyrics: Shōko Fujibayashi
Composition: Hidehiro Kawai
Arrangement: Keiichi Tomita
Artist: Beverly

Release
It was released in Japan on August 4, 2018, in a double billing with Kaitou Sentai Lupinranger VS Keisatsu Sentai Patranger en Film.

DVD and Blu-ray was released on January 9, 2019.

Reception Kamen Rider Build the Movie: Be the One'' grossed $4,888,000 at the box office.

References

External links
 
 

2018 films
2010s Kamen Rider films
2018 action films
Japanese action films
2010s Japanese superhero films
Toei Company films
Films scored by Kenji Kawai
Dystopian films